The Anglican Church in Central America is a province of the Anglican Communion, covering five sees in Central America.

History
Four of the five dioceses of the Iglesia Anglicana de la Región Central de America were founded by the Episcopal Church in the United States of America. Anglicanism was also introduced by the Society for the Propagation of the Gospel when the United Kingdom administered two colonies in Central America, British Honduras and Miskitia. In later years, immigrants brought the Anglican Church with them. This first period is often called the time of the chaplaincies.

Bishop William C. Frey was consecrated as the first missionary bishop of the Diocese of Guatemala in 1967.

By 2008, the Anglican Church in Central America had voted to consecrate women bishops although none of have been consecrated as of yet. By 2013, the Diocese of El Salvador offered ministries on behalf of and in support of LGBT members.

Julio Murray, Bishop of Panama, was elected as Primate in April 2018 and took office with his installation on 11 August, succeeding Sturdie Downs, Bishop of Nicaragua. Downs was elected in late 2014 to serve a four-year term of office as primate (2015–2019); he succeeded Armando Guerra, Bishop of Guatemala (2011–2015), who in turn succeeded Martin Barahona, Bishop of El Salvador (2003–2011).

Membership
Today, there are over 35,000 Anglicans out of an estimated population of 30.1 million.

Structure
The polity of the Iglesia Anglicana de la Región Central de América is Episcopalian church governance, which is the same as other Anglican churches. The church maintains a system of geographical parishes organized into dioceses. There are 5 of these, each headed by a bishop:

 The Diocese of Costa Rica
 The Diocese of El Salvador
 The Diocese of Guatemala
 The Diocese of Nicaragua
 The Diocese of Panamá

Some countries of Central America are part of other Anglican churches:
 The Anglican Diocese of Belize is part of the Church in the Province of the West Indies
 The Episcopal Diocese of Honduras is part of Province 9 of the Episcopal Church in the United States of America

Worship and liturgy
The Iglesia Anglicana de la Región Central de América embraces three orders of ministry: deacon, priest, and bishop. The Spanish-language version of the Episcopal Church (USA)'s 1979 Book of Common Prayer is used.

Doctrine and practice

The center of the Iglesia Anglicana de la Región Central de América's teaching is the life and resurrection of Jesus Christ. The basic teachings of the church, or catechism, includes:
Jesus Christ is fully human and fully God. He died and was resurrected from the dead. 
Jesus provides the way of eternal life for those who believe.
The Old and New Testaments of the Bible were written by people "under the inspiration of the Holy Spirit".  The Apocrypha are additional books that are used in Christian worship, but not for the formation of doctrine.
The two great and necessary sacraments are Holy Baptism and Holy Eucharist
Other sacramental rites are confirmation, ordination, marriage, reconciliation of a penitent, and unction. 
Belief in heaven, hell, and Jesus' return in glory.

Ecumenical relations
Unlike many other Anglican churches, the Iglesia Anglicana de la Región Central de América is not a member of the ecumenical World Council of Churches.

Ordination of women 
Within the province, the dioceses represent a diversity of opinions on social issues. Regarding gender equality, the province has dioceses, including the Episcopal Church of Costa Rica, that recognize women in ordained ministry. In 2012, the Episcopal Church in Nicaragua ordained two women as priests.

Human sexuality 
In 2003, the Primate, or Presiding Bishop, of the Anglican Church in Central America attended the consecration of Bishop Gene Robinson, the first openly gay and partnered bishop in the Anglican Communion. The Diocese of El Salvador formed a ministry for LGBT people in the country. In 2014, the Episcopal Church of Costa Rica, a diocese of the province, has taken steps to welcome LGBT members. Also in 2014, the diocese in El Salvador continued to offer a space for LGBT members to "freely express themselves." The Diocese of Guatemala elected Silvestre Enrique Romero as bishop coadjutor in 2017. Romero, prior to being elected bishop, served in the US Episcopal Church and offered to bless same-sex unions as priest-in-charge.

See also 
Cornelius Wilson, Bishop of Costa Rica

References

Further reading

External links
Diocesis de El Salvador Website

Iglesia Anglicana de la Region Central de America

Central America
Protestantism in Costa Rica
Protestantism in El Salvador
Christian denominations in Guatemala
Protestantism in Nicaragua
Christian denominations in Panama